András Hargitay (born 17 March 1956) is a retired swimmer from Hungary, who won the bronze medal in the 400 m individual medley at the 1972 Summer Olympics. He finished fourth in the same event at the 1976 and 1980 Games, missing the bronze medal by less than 0.3 seconds in both cases. In 1974, he set a new world record in the 400 m medley.

He was named Hungarian Sportsman of the Year in 1975 after winning two gold medals at the 1975 World Aquatics Championships.

See also
 List of members of the International Swimming Hall of Fame

References
 
 les-sports.info
 Jean-Louis Meuret (2007), HistoFINA Volume IV – Tome IV. MEDALLISTS AND STATISTICS. Special FINA WORLD SWIMMING CHAMPIONSHIPS (50 m.) Before Rome 2009.

External links 

 
 
 

1956 births
Living people
Male medley swimmers
Hungarian male swimmers
Swimmers at the 1972 Summer Olympics
Swimmers at the 1976 Summer Olympics
Swimmers at the 1980 Summer Olympics
Olympic swimmers of Hungary
World record setters in swimming
Swimmers from Budapest
Place of birth missing (living people)
Olympic bronze medalists in swimming
Olympic bronze medalists for Hungary
World Aquatics Championships medalists in swimming
European Aquatics Championships medalists in swimming
European champions for Hungary
Medalists at the 1972 Summer Olympics
Universiade medalists in swimming
Universiade gold medalists for Hungary
Medalists at the 1977 Summer Universiade
20th-century Hungarian people
21st-century Hungarian people